2012–13 Ligue Nationale de Handball Division 1 season is the 61st since its establishment. Montpellier were the defending champions, having won their title the previous season.

Teams

Regular season

Standings

source:handnews.fr

Results
In the table below the home teams are listed on the left and the away teams along the top.

Statistics

Top scorers

Top goalkeepers

External links
LNH site

Handball leagues in France
2012–13 domestic handball leagues